Jean-François Gaultier de Biauzat (1739-1815) was a French politician. He served as a member of the National Constituent Assembly from 1789 to 1791, and as the mayor of Clermont-Ferrand from 1790 to 1791.

References

1739 births
1815 deaths
People from Puy-de-Dôme
Mayors of Clermont-Ferrand